La Academia Última Generación is the last generation of La Academia, according to its producer Eva Borja. Auditions were held in many cities across Mexico, Guatemala and the United States in July. The program was broadcast on Televisión Azteca for 16 weeks from August 31 to December 14, 2008.

The headmaster of La Academia  is Héctor Martinez, the same of the first two generations. The teachers are almost the same of the first generation, the host is Rafael Araneda from Chile, 20 is the number of contestants who are competing in the last generation of La Academia. The finale was on December 14, 2008, where the six generations sang all together closing the show and the reality forever. The winner was 21-year-old Maria Fernanda Alvo from Guadalajara, Fabiola Rodas from Guatemala was the runner-up, Luis Armando Lozano was 3rd place, Valeria Dessens 4th place and Perla Estrada was 5th.

Results 

1Lyanne Rebeca García Parra was  expelled before Concert 1.

Final 20

This year, the Final 20 are composed by 11 girls and 9 guys, and as of the Final 5, there are left 4 girls and only 1 guy:
Maria Fernanda Alvo Díaz (María Fernanda), 21,  -  
Jackeline Fabiola Rodas Valladares (Fabiola), 15,  - Guatemala City 
Luis Armando Lozano Acosta (Luis Armando) A.K.A. Paolo Botti, 24,  -  
Valeria Argentina Dessens Cerdeña(Valeria), 16,  -  
Perla Isabel Estrada Hernández (Perla), 17,  -  
Rosa Alejandra Garza Guizar(Alex), 21, -  
Julia Jacqueline González Padilla (Jackie), 22, -   
Gerardo Matías Aranda García (Matías), 23, - Córdoba 
Wilfredo Pineda Gastelum (Wilfredo), 16, -   
Estebán Velázquez (Estéban), 18,  -   
Cintia Maribel Urtiaga Peña (Cintia), 17,  -  
Iván Estrada Quintanar (Iván), 18, Mexico City, 
Fátima Ileana Molina Vargas (Fátima), 22,  -  
Héctor Silva del Castillo (Héctor), 25, -  
Alba del Carmen Alcudia Oriano (Alba), 15,  -  
Gerardo Antonio Castillo Orellana (Gerardo), 22, - Guatemala City 
Monserrat Monroy Cruz (Monserrat), 18, -  
Dasahev López Saavedra (Dazahev), 19, -  
Alejandra Sandoval Llamas (Alejandra), 15, -  
José Roberto Carrillo Pérez (José Roberto), 24, -

Concerts

Concert 1
Aired on August 31, 2008
The Final 24 performed the next songs:
"Vuelvo A Comenzar" (Timbiriche) - Gerardo, Jackie, Wilfredo
"Un Montón De Estrellas (Polo Montañez) - Alba, Ivan, Monserrat
"Estos Celos" (Vicente Fernández) - Esteban, Perla, José Roberto
"Las De La Intuición" (Shakira) - Fabiola, Cintia, Fátima
"Como Un Lobo" (Miguel Bosé) - Matias, Erik, Alejandra, Flor
"El Tiempo De Ti" (Playa Limbo) - Valeria, María Fernanda, Alex
"Me Enamora" (Juanes) - Hector, Manuel
"Mi Credo" (K-Paz de la Sierra) - Dasahev, Luis Armando, Sergio
The 25 contestants that made it to the propaedeutic course sang in trios, except of Lyanne who was expelled before the concert.
The 5 eliminated were: Lyanne, Flor de María, Erick, Manuel and Sergio.

Concert 2
Aired on September 7, 2008
The 20 contestants will be performing for the first time in duets.

For their development in Concert 1; Jackie, Dasahev, Valeria, Estéban and Gerardo were selected to do another song besides the one they had in other to show themselves more to the audience.

Eliminated: Jose Roberto

Concert 3
Aired on September 14, 2008
Guests: Raul Sandoval & Nadia
Sentenced: Luis Armando (by contestants) and Alejandra (by the judges)
Eliminated: Alejandra

Concert 4
Aired on September 21, 2008
Guest: Victor Garcia
Sentenced: Monserrat (by the contestants), Perla (by the teachers), Dasahev(by the judges)
Eliminated: Dasahev

Concert 5
Aired on September 28, 2008
The Final 17 performed the next songs:
"Me Equivoqué" (María José) - Alex
"Amargo Adiós" (Inspector) - Wilfredo
"No Soy El Aire" (Banda Guanatos) - Luis Armando
"Si Tú Te Atreves" (Luis Miguel) - Iván
"Yo Por él" (Yuridia) - Maria Fernanda
"Falsas Esperanzas" (Christina Aguilera) - Valeria
"Tatuajes" (Joan Sebastian) - Fátima, Hector
"Labios Compartidos" (Maná) - Jackie, Matias
"Daria" (La 5ta Estación) - Gerardo, Fabiola
"Sin él" (Marisela) - Perla
"Por Tu Amor" (Alacranes Musical) - Alba, Esteban
"Devórame Otra Vez" (Azúcar Moreno) - Cintia, Monserrat
Guest: Carlos Rivera, winner of the 3rd generation performed "Que Nivel de Mujer" and "Te me Vas"
Sentended: Monserrat (by the judges), Perla (by the contestants), Cintia (by the teachers)
Eliminated: Monserrat

Concert 6
Aired on October 5, 2008
The Final 16 performed the next songs individually or in duets:

Guest: Samuel Castelán Marini
Sentenced: Gerardo(by the teachers), Héctor (by the judges)
Eliminated: Gerardo

Concert 7
Aired on October 12, 2008
The Final 15 performed the next songs:
"Besos De Ceniza" (Timbiriche) - Fátima, Cintia
"Por Mujeres Como Tú" (Pepe Aguilar) - Wilfredo
"La Bomba" (Ricky Martin) - Iván
"Ya No Quiero" (Jesse & Joy) - Alex
"Como Quien Pierde Una Estrella" (Alejandro Fernández) - Esteban
"Lloraré las penas" (David Bisbal) - Hector, Matias
"Sueños Rotos" (La 5ta Estación) - Valeria
"Quién Eres Tú " (Yuri) - Fabiola
"Estés En Donde Estés " (Ha-Ash) - Alba, Perla
"Mala Hierba " (Alejandra Guzmán) - Maria Fernanda
"Hazme Olvidarla " (Alberto Vázquez) - Luis Armando
"Que Ganas De No Verte Nunca Más " (Valeria Lynch) - Jackie
Guest: Estrella, Erika, Aranza
Sentenced: Alba (by the teachers) and Luis Armando (by the judges)
Eliminated: Alba

Concert 8
Aired on October 19, 2008
The Final 14 performed the next songs:
"Tú" (Noelia) - Maria Fernanda
"Entra En Mi Vida" (Sin Bandera) - Esteban
"Si Una Vez" (Selena) - Valeria
"Sé Como Duele" (Karina) - Fabiola
"Una Noche De Copas" (María Conchita Alonso) - Fátima
"Bella" (Manuel Mijares) - Wilfredo
"Tu De Que Vas" (Grupo Imposter) - Perla
"Me Equivoqué" (Mariana Seoane) - Cintia
"No Me Doy Por Vencido" (Luis Fonsi) - Iván
"Gavilán O Paloma" (José José) - Luis Armando
"A Que No Le Cuentas" (Ednita Nazario) - Jackie
"Mujeres" (Ricardo Arjona) - Matias
"Chica De Humo" (Emmanuel) - Héctor
"Quítame Ese Hombre" (Pilar Montenegro) - Alex
Guest: Yuridia
Sentenced: Wilfredo (by the contestants), Luis Armando (by the teachers), Héctor (by the judges)
Eliminated: Héctor

Concert 9
Aired on October 26, 2008
The Final 13 performed the next songs:
"Me dediqué a perderte" (Alejandro Fernández) - Jackie and Esteban
"Pienso en ti" (Adriana Foster) - Valeria and Alex
"Lo siento" (Belinda) - Fabiola and Maria Fernanda
"Por ti volaré" (Andrea Bocelli) - Wilfredo
"La cosa más bella" (Eros Ramazzotti) - Luis Armando
"Princesa Tibetana" (Timbiriche) - Iván
"Antología" (Shakira) - Fátima
"La Plaga" (Alejandra Guzmán) - Perla
"Lluvia" (Luis Angel) - Cintia
"Vuelve" (Ricky Martin) - Matías
Guests: Franco De Vita and Carlos Rivera  performed "Si La Ves"
Nominated: Fátima (nominated by the contestants), Perla (nominated by the teachers), Wilfredo (nominated by the judges)
Eliminated: Fátima

Concert 10
Aired on November 2, 2008
The Final 12 performed the next songs in pairs:
"Dime Ven" (Motel) - Ivan and Matias
"Lo haré por ti" (Paulina Rubio) - Perla and Cintia
"Tocando fondo" (Kalimba) - Fabiola and Alex
"Mujeres divinas" (Vicente Fernández) - Esteban and Wilfredo
"El Incondicional" (Edith Márquez) - Valeria and Maria Fernanda
"Mis Ojos Lloran Por ti" (Big Boy) - Jackie and Luis Armando
Guest: Myriam, Yahir, Estrella, Raúl Sandoval, and the rest of the 1st Generation.
Nominated: Wilfredo (Nominated by the contestants), Iván (Nominated by the teachers), Cintia (Nominated by the judges)
Eliminated: Iván

Concert 11
Aired on November 9, 2008
The Final 11 performed the next songs individually:
"Ahora te puedes marchar" (Luis Miguel) - Wilfredo
"Algo más" (La Quinta Estación) - Alex
"Mientes tan bien" (Sin Bandera) - Matías
"La papa sin catsup" (Gloria Trevi) - Perla
"Como me haces falta" (Ana Bárbara) - Cintia
"Sabes a chocolate" (Kumbia Kings) - Estéban
"La Voz de la Experiencia" (India) - Marifer
"Detrás de Mi Ventana" (Yuri) - Valeria
"Malo" (Bebe) - Jackie
"La Planta" (Caos) - Luis Armando
"Cómo Olvidar" (Olga Tañón) - Fabiola
Guest: TBA
Nominated: Fabiola (By the Contestants), Luis Armando (By the Teachers), Cintia (By the Judges)
Eliminated: Cintia

Concert 12
Aired on November 16, 2008
The Final 10 performed the next songs individually.
"Sueños" (Diego Torres) - Wilfredo
"Desesperada" (Marta Sánchez) - Alex
"La muralla" (Enanitos Verdes) - Matías
"Carcacha" (Selena) - Perla
"El Aventurero" (Pedro Fernández) - Estéban
"El Hombre que yo amo" (Myriam Hernández) - Marifer
"Si quieres verme llorar" (Lisa López) - Valeria
"Secreto de Amor" (Joan Sebastian) - Jackie
"En mi viejo San Juan" (Javier Solís) - Luis Armando
"El tiempo pasa" (Antonio Aguilar) - Fabiola
Guest: None
Nominated: Wilfredo (By the Former Contestants), Esteban (By the Teachers), Luis Armando (By the Judges)
Eliminated: Esteban

Concert 13
Aired on November 23, 2008
The Final 9 performed the next songs individually:
"Otra Vez" (Victor García) - Wilfredo
"Así fue" (Juan Gabriel) - Alex
"Lamento Boliviano" (Enanitos Verdes) - Matías
"Cielo Rojo" (Lola Beltrán) - Perla
"Cuando baja la marea" (Yuri) - Fabiola
"De mí enamorate" (Daniela Romo) - Valeria
"Otro día más sin verte" (Jon Secada) - Jackie
"Me enamoro de ti" (Uff!) - Luis Armando
"Angel" (Belinda) - Maria Fernanda
Guest: None
This concert there was a surprise as Rafa Araneda announced that not only one but two contestants were going to be eliminated.
In the first elimination the contestants sang in duels to start determinating the nominees for the first elimination:
Fabiola vs Wilfredo - Nominated from the duel: Wilfredo
Jackie vs Perla - Nominated from the duel: Perla
Matias vs Luis Armando - Nominated from the duel: Both Matias and Luis Armando
Alex vs Valeria vs Maria Fernanda - Nominated from the duel: Alex
Then the judges and the teachers decided which two losers from the duels would go to face the public vote.
Nominated by the teachers and the judges to face the public vote: Wilfredo and Perla
First Eliminated: Wilfredo
After the elimination of Wilfredo, Rafa Araneda announced the public's vote positions
Public's votes places after Wilfredo's elimination:
1st place: Perla
2nd place: Fabiola
3rd place: Valeria
4th place: Maria Fernanda
5th place: Luis Armando
6th place: Matías
7th place: Jackie
8th place: Alex

Second elimination first part of Special challenge: Alex, Perla, Matias and Luis Armando had a free dance challenge, and the teachers saved Perla
Second elimination second part of Special challenge: Alex, Matias and Luis Armando will have to do ballroom dance. Matias lost the challenge and was nominated by the teachers.
Second elimination nominees:
Maria Fernanda (By the judges), Matías (By the Teachers) and Jackie (By the Contestants)

After the nomination from the contestants, it was revealed a new list of positions by public vote:
1st place: Fabiola
2nd place: Perla
3rd place: Valeria
4th place: Luis Armando
5th place: Alex
6th place: Matias
7th place: Jackie
8th place: Maria Fernanda

Second Eliminated: Matias
After the elimination of Matias, Luis Armando remains as the last male standing in the Final 7 with 6 girls and him.

Concert 14
Aired on November 30, 2008
The Final 7 performed the next songs individually:
"Huele a peligro" (Banda Limón) - Alex
"Como tu mujer" (Rocío Dúrcal) - Perla
"Yo pa ti no estoy" (Rossana) - Fabiola
"Aún sin ti" (Los hijos de Sánchez) - Valeria
"Lloran las rosas" (Cristian Castro) - Jackie
"El tordillo" (Vicente Fernández) - Luis Armando
"Angel" (Jon Secada) - Maria Fernanda
Besides the individual songs, there will be 2 duets and 1 trio:
"Gimme More" (Britney Spears) - Fabiola, Maria Fernanda and Jackie
"Lo que paso paso" (Daddy Yankee) - Luis Armando and Alex
"Love Today" (Mika) - Perla and Valeria
Guest: None
Valeria and Maria Fernanda had a challenge to decide the First Finalist for the Grand Finale, the teachers and the judges decided that Valeria had to be the First Finalist.
Positions by Public Vote after Judges' nomination:
 Maria Fernanda
 Valeria
 Perla
 Luis Armando
 Fabiola
 Jackie
 Alex
After a Special Dance Challenge, the teachers nominated Alex.
After the Contestants' Nomination, where the Contestants nominated Jackie with 5 votes, it was shown the new Positions by Public Vote:
 Valeria
 Maria Fernanda
 Luis Armando
 Fabiola
 Perla
 Jackie
 Alex
Nominated: Perla (By the Judges), Alex (By the teachers), and Jackie(By the contestants)
Perla was saved first by a huge difference of votes ahead of the other two nominees.
Eliminated: Jackie

Concert 15
 Aired on December 7, 2008
The Final 6 will perform the next songs individually:
"Tarde" (Rocio Dúrcal) - Alex
"Hey güera" (Alejandra Guzmán) - Perla
"Por cobardía" (Lila Deneken) - Fabiola
"Mentira" (Hernaldo Zúñiga) - Valeria
"Caminos de Michoacán" (Vicente Fernández) - Luis Armando
"Total Eclipse of the Heart" (Taylor Dayne) - Maria Fernanda
Besides the individual songs, there will be 3 duets:
"Me nace del corazón" (Juan Gabriel) - Alex and Perla
"La tortura" (Shakira and Alejandro Sanz) - Luis Armando and Maria Fernanda
"Ven conmigo" (Christina Aguilera) - Fabiola and Valeria
Guest: None
Fabiola and Maria Fernanda had a challenge to decide the Second Finalist for the Grand Finale, the teachers and the judges decided that Maria Fernanda had to be the Second Finalist Along With Valeria
Positions by Public Vote after The Contestant nomination:
 Maria Fernanda
 Fabiola
 Luis Armando
 Alex
 Perla
 Valeria
Nominees: Perla (by the judges), Luis Armando (by the teachers) and Alex (by the contestants)
Eliminated: Alex(Eliminated at the Finals)
Finalists (Final 5):
1st Valeria
2nd Maria Fernanda
3rd Fabiola
4th Luis Armando
5th Perla

Concert 16 (Grand Finale)
Aired on December 14, 2008 on Tuxtla Gutierrez, Chiapas.
The Final 6 will perform the next songs individually:
"Regresa A Mí" (Thalía) - Alex
"Lo Siento Mi Amor" (Lupita D'Alessio) - Perla
"Regresa A Mi" (Toni Braxton) - Fabiola
""Volverte A Amar" (Alejandra Guzmán) Valeria
"Al Final" (Emmanuel) - Luis Armando
"Sobreviviré" (Mónica Naranjo) - Maria Fernanda
Besides, they will also sing their best song of the season:
"Asi Fue" (Juan Gabriel) - Alex
" La Papa Sin Catsup" (Gloria Trevi) - Perla
"Como Olvidar" (Olga Tañón) - Fabiola
"Ese Hombre" (La India) - Valeria
"Mis Ojos Lloran Por Ti" (Big Boy) - Luis Armando
"Él Me Mintió" (Amanda Miguel) - Maria Fernanda
Positions by Public Vote announced after the dance challenge:
1st place: Luis Armando
2nd place: Maria Fernanda
3rd place: Fabiola
4th place: Perla
5th place: Valeria
Nominations for winning: Maria Fernanda (By the Teachers), Valeria (By the Contestants) and TBA (By the Judges)
Positions by Public Vote announced after the Contestants' nomination for the winner:
1st place: Fabiola
2nd place: Luis Armando
3rd place: Maria Fernanda
4th place: Valeria
5th place: Perla
Final positions:
1st Place: Maria Fernanda
2nd Place: Fabiola Rodas
3rd Place: Luis Armando
4th Place: Valeria
5th Place: Perla
6th Place: Alex
Winner: Maria Fernanda

Professors and staff
Headmaster: Héctor Martínez
Singing: Lula Ross, Willy Gutierrez
Choreography: Guillermina Gómez
Body Expression: Charly D
Theatre: Carmen Delgado
Voice Mounting: Beto Castillo and Raúl Carballeda
Psychologist: Lizi Rodriguez
Host: Rafael Araneda (from Rojo Fama Contrafama in Chile)
Judges: Enrique Guzmán, Raúl Quintanilla, Lisset and Arturo López Gavito

References

Season 6
2008 Mexican television seasons